A Maid to Order is a 1916 American silent comedy film featuring Oliver Hardy.

Cast
 Oliver Hardy as Plump (as Babe Hardy)
 Raymond McKee as The Man of the House
 Kate Price as Plump's Wife
 Florence McLaughlin as The Lady of the House

See also
 List of American films of 1916
 Oliver Hardy filmography

External links

1916 films
1916 short films
American silent short films
Silent American comedy films
American black-and-white films
1916 comedy films
American comedy short films
1910s American films